Rafał Milach (born 1978) is a Polish visual artist and photographer. His work is about the transformation taking place in the former Eastern Bloc, for which he undertakes long-term projects. He is an associate member of Magnum Photos.

Milach's books include 7 Rooms (2011), In the Car with R (2012), Black Sea of Concrete (2013), The Winners (2014) and The First March of Gentlemen (2017). He is a co-founder of the Sputnik Photos collective.

He won a 2008 World Press Photo award. 7 Rooms won the Pictures of the Year International Best Photography Book Award in 2011. In 2017 his exhibition Refusal was a finalist for the Deutsche Börse Photography Prize.

Milach lectures in photography at the Institute of Creative Photography (ITF), Silesian University in Opava, Czech Republic.

Life and work
Milach was born in 1978 in Gliwice, Poland. He graduated from the Academy of Fine Arts in Katowice in 2003 and the Institute of Creative Photography (ITF), Silesian University in Opava, Czech Republic.

With ten other Central Eastern European photographers, he co-founded Sputnik Photos, a collective documenting transition in post-Soviet states.

For his first book, 7 Rooms (2011), Milach accompanied and photographed seven young people for several years living in the Russian cities of Moscow, Yekaterinburg and Krasnoyarsk.

In the Car with R (2012) was made on a 10-day road trip, driving 1450 kilometres around Iceland's circular Route 1. Milach made photographs and his local guide, the writer , made diary entries.

Black Sea of Concrete (2013) is about the Ukrainian Black Sea coast, about its people, of whom he made portraits, and the abundant Soviet-era geometric blocks strewn along the coastline.

Milach spent two years in Belarus from 2011 exploring its dire economic and political situation. Belarus is "a country caught between the ultra-traditional values of an older Soviet era and the viral influence of western popular culture." Milach was interested in the clean, tidy glamorous facade maintained by the state. His book The Winners (2014), portraits of winners of various "Best of Belarus" state and local contests promoted by the government, is a typology of state propaganda. It depicts mostly people, but also anonymous interiors that had won awards. The obscure official prizes are intended to foster national pride but to an outside audience might appear tragicomic. Milach travelled around the country working in the role of "an old-fashioned propaganda photographer". He was guided by the authorities as to who, where and how to photograph, a process which only improved his revealing the ideology of the state. Milach has said "the winners are everywhere, but the winnings are not for the winners – they are for the system", "the state is not interested in individuals, only in mass control."

The First March of Gentlemen (2017) was made on a 2016 residency at Kolekcja Września to make work about life in Września. The town is synonymous with the Września children strike, the protests of Polish children and their parents against Germanization that occurred between 1901 and 1904. In 2016, there were many demonstrations by Citizens of Poland, a civic movement engaged in pro-democracy and anti-fascist actions, opposed to the political changes brought about by the government led by the Law and Justice (PiS) party. Milach's book of collages mixes illustrations of the children strike with characters that lived in Września during the communist era in the 1950s and 1960s taken by local amateur photographer Ryszard Szczepaniak. This "delineates a fictitious narrative that can be read as a metaphor, commenting on the social and political tensions of the present day."

Milach became a nominee member of Magnum Photos in 2018 and as of 2022 is an associate member. He co-founded the Archive of Public Protests in 2019. He lectures in photography at the ITF.

Personal life
He is married to Ania Nałęcka-Milach.

Publications

Publications by Milach
7 Rooms. With texts by Svetlana Alexievich.
First edition. Heidelberg, Germany: Kehrer, 2011. .
Second edition. Heidelberg, Germany: Kehrer, 2013.
Black Sea of Concrete. Warsaw: [Rafał Milach], 2013. Photographs and text (in English). Edition of 300 copies. .
The Winners.
First edition. London: Gost, 2014. . Edition of 553 copies (500 copies of the regular edition, 53 copies of the special edition).
Second edition. London: Gost, 2014. . Edition of 200 copies.
The First March of Gentlemen.
First edition. Kolekcja Wrzesińska, 2017.
Second edition. London: Gost, 2018. . Edition of 650 copies.
Nearly Every Rose On The Barriers In Front Of The Parliament. Warsaw: Jednostka Gallery, 2018. Polish-language edition; ; edition of 300 copies. English-language edition; ; edition of 200 copies.
I Am Warning You. London: Gost, 2021. . Boxed set of four books, #13767, I Am Warning You, Death Strip and collected essays.
Strajk / Strike. Jednostka Gallery, 2021. .

Zines by Milach
Pressident. Galeria Szara, 2017. . 5 posters. Edition of 350 copies.

Publications paired with others
In the Car with R: 29 Notes on Photography, Iceland and More. Gliwice: Museum in Gliwice, 2011. . "Project manager: Maga Sokalska / Czytelnia Sztuki". Edition of 450 copies.
W samochodzie z R.: 29 uwag o fotografii, Islandii i nie tylko. Gliwice: Muzeum w Gliwicach, 2011. . Photographs by Milach, text (a Polish translation of Með R í bílnum) by Huldar Breiðfjörð. Edition of 250 copies.

Publications with contributions by Milach
At the Border. [Warsaw]: Sputnik Photos, 2008. . The untitled preface says that the book "describes the illegal labour markets in the new member states of the European Union (Poland, Slovakia and Slovenia)." Milach contributes an essay, "Linh in Poland", about a Vietnamese man working at Jarmark Europa.
U. [Warsaw]: Sputnik Photos, 2010. . Photographs by Jan Brykczyński, Andrej Balco, Agnieszka Rayss, Milach (from the series Black Sea of Concrete), Filip Singer, Ivan Kurinnoy, Janis Pipars and Justyna Mielnikiewicz. With short texts in English by Serhiy Zhadan, Irena Karpa, and the photographers. "Photos taken in Ukraine in 2008–2010"; "the non-profit organization Altemus commissioned a team of young East European photographers from Sputnik Photos collective and Ukrainian writers, to travel the country and capture its ethos". Milach is credited as "book photo editor". Edition of 300 copies.
IS (not). [Warsaw]: Sputnik Photos, 2010. Edition of 1000 copies. "A group project about Iceland by 5 polish photographers and 5 Icelandic writers."
Stand By = Ӡа Беларусь. Warsaw: Sputnik Photos, 2012. . Photographs of Belarus by Jan Brykczyński, Andrei Liankevich, Manca Juvan, Milach (from the series The Winners), Justyna Mielnikiewicz, Adam Pańczuk and Agnieszka Rayss. Edition of 1000 copies.
Distant Place. Warsaw: Copernicus Science Centre, 2012. . 5 books in soft cover, newspaper.
Contact sheets. The Selected Photos. Vol II. Postcart, 2014. . Edited by Giammaria DE Gasperis. With a foreword by Elisabeth Biondi.
Psopplaainnd. Mapping the Blind Spots. Warsaw: Sputnik Photos; Madrid: Nophoto, 2014. .
Lost Territories Wordbook. Lost Territories Archive 1. Warsaw: Sputnik Photos, 2016. Photographs by various. Nearly one hundred short texts from twenty-one authors.
Fruit Garden. Lost Territories Archive 3. Warsaw: Sputnik Photos, 2017. . Edition of 500 copies.

Awards
2009: Winner, first prize stories, Arts and Entertainment, World Press Photo 2008, Amsterdam
2012: 7 Rooms won Best Photography Book Award, 69th / 2011 Pictures of the Year International
2017: Finalist, Deutsche Börse Photography Prize for his exhibition Refusal
2019: Light Work Artist Residency, Syracuse NY.

Exhibitions
7 Rooms, Brandts Museum of Photographic Art, Brandts, Odense, Denmark, 2013–2014
Refusal, Atlas Sztuki Gallery, Łódź, Poland, 2017.
The Winners, Side Gallery, Newcastle upon Tyne, UK, 2018
Refusal, Deutsche Börse Photography Prize, The Photographers' Gallery, London, 2018
7 Rooms, Zachęta National Gallery of Art, Warsaw, Poland 2012

Notes

References

External links

Photographs from The Winners in The Guardian
We Are All Witnesses to the Catastrophe: An Interview with Rafał Milach on Culture.pl

1978 births
Living people
Polish photographers
Magnum photographers
People from Gliwice